Velma Dinkley is a fictional character in the Scooby-Doo franchise. She is usually seen wearing a baggy orange turtleneck sweater, a short red pleated skirt (or in later episodes an A-line skirt, or sometimes shorts), knee socks, Mary Jane shoes, and a pair of black square glasses, which she frequently loses and cannot see without.  During the winter, she sometimes wears high-heeled boots. She is seen as the "brains" of the group.

Character description
Throughout her various incarnations, Velma is usually portrayed as a highly intelligent, young, white woman with an interest in the sciences. She is also often portrayed as being very well-read on obscure fields such as Norse writing (as in the third Scooby-Doo series, The Scooby-Doo Show). Due to her intelligence and problem-solving abilities, Velma is typically the first one to solve the mystery and, like Sherlock Holmes and many other fictional detectives, often keeps her conclusions secret till the end of the story. Velma Dinkley was inspired by the brainy sweater girl Zelda Gilroy, as played by Sheila Kuehl, from the late 1950s/early 1960s American sitcom The Many Loves of Dobie Gillis.

A running gag in Scooby-Doo, Where Are You! and The New Scooby-Doo Movies is Velma's severe myopia and her ability to repeatedly lose her glasses (often the result of them falling off her face while she is being chased by a villain), saying "My glasses! I can't see without my glasses!" whenever she accidentally misplaces them. Another running gag occurs when other frightened characters leap into her arms.

Velma is characterized as the most skeptical of the gang and is most likely to discount any paranormal explanations to their mysteries. This is particularly evident in the films Scooby-Doo! and the Curse of the 13th Ghost and Scooby-Doo! Return to Zombie Island, in which she discounts ghosts and zombies (which are real within the context of the franchise) that could not be unmasked by claiming they are hallucinations.

Character background
Like all of the Scooby-Doo kids, later ret-conned as Mystery Incorporated members, Velma has a differing personal backstory and origin in different series.

In the original series Scooby-Doo, Where Are You!, Velma is shown to attend the same high school as the rest of the gang (as stated in the inaugural episode "What a Night for a Knight"). However, by The New Scooby-Doo Movies, Velma is said to have graduated from a different high school (as stated in the episode "Spirited Spooked Sports Show"). In the film Scooby-Doo! Curse of the Lake Monster, it is revealed that her middle name is Daisy.

According to Scooby-Doo: Behind the Scenes, before she said "Jinkies!" she used to say "Oh, my!" but it wasn't as catchy. Her parents are depicted to have pushed her from an early age to excel in her studies, resulting in hundreds of awards for outstanding achievement. Because of this, she is more vocal than her comrades would like. Of course, she also does her share of sweet-talking too.

During the first season of the 2010–2013 series Scooby-Doo! Mystery Incorporated, Velma is in a romantic relationship with Shaggy, much to the distaste of Scooby-Doo. Their relationship ends in "Howl of the Fright Hound" (season 1, episode 10). This series' incarnation of Velma is shown to be secretive and controlling. In the second season of Mystery Incorporated, Velma is shown secretly working for the series' overarching villain, Mr. E, alongside Marcie "Hot Dog Water" Fleach who is Velma's former rival in science fairs. The two become friends after Velma returns to the gang and by the time of the series finale, Velma and Marcie are teammates at the Tri-state Olympiad of Science. This version of Velma  frequently uses the expressions "Oy" and "Oy gevalt", and is also shown listening to Klezmer music, hinting at a Jewish identity.

Love interests

Velma Dinkley is usually shown in relationships with men such as Shaggy Rogers (with whom she has a son in Scooby Apocalypse), Johnny Bravo, Patrick Wisely, Sam Winchester, Ben Ravencroft, and many other male characters, although since the 2010s, she has been depicted as also being romantically interested in other women, such as Coco Diablo.

In 2020, James Gunn, the screenwriter of the 2002 Scooby-Doo film, stated that Velma was written "eyeballing Daphne" in early drafts of the script in accordance with the film's original intent as an R-rated deconstruction of the Scooby-Doo canon (with Shaggy meant to be depicted as a stoner, and Fred a gangster, the latter also ambiguously portrayed in the final film by Freddie Prinze Jr. as "closeted gay because of the ascot"), although the final film would see Velma have a romance with a male waiter, with the film's 2004 sequel Scooby-Doo 2: Monsters Unleashed further depicting Velma in a full romantic relationship with Seth Green's character, Patrick Wisely.

While addressing comments on his Instagram page in 2020 about Mystery Incorporateds episode director labelling its version of Velma as being bisexual, producer Tony Cervone confirmed in response that his intention was for this iteration of Velma's relationship with Marcie "Hot Dog Water" Fleach to be depicted—as clearly as would be permitted at the time—as a romantic one, following her previous failed relationship with Shaggy, with the characters subtly implied to be in a relationship in the series finale, with Marcie referring to Velma as "my girl". In the 2022 animated film Trick or Treat Scooby-Doo!, Velma is depicted as "crushing big time" on female supporting antagonist Coco Diablo, which was widely reported by online news media as confirmation of the character's lesbianism. However, right after the release of Trick or Treat, it was revealed that Velma would have a "secret crush" on Fred in the HBO Max adult-oriented and metafictional streaming television series Velma, pitched as a "love quadrangle", in which both Shaggy and Daphne would be depicted as having crushes on a South Asian version of Velma.

Relatives
Relatives of Velma shown during the series' run include:

 Dale and Angie Dinkley: Velma's parents in Scooby-Doo! Mystery Incorporated (2010–13), voiced by Kevin Dunn and Frances Conroy. They own the Crystal Cove Mystery Museum, which has in its display all of the costumes from the villains the gang has defeated over the years, as well as other objects connected to the supernatural or the unexplainable.
 Madelyn Dinkley: Velma's sister in Scooby-Doo! Abracadabra-Doo, voiced by Danica McKellar. She appears to be in her late teens and somewhat resembles Velma in appearance and personality. Velma refers to Madelyn as a nerd and does not seem to realize how much alike they really are. She helps the gang when the magic school where she's enrolled is terrorized by a giant griffin, maintaining a consistent crush on Velma's ex-boyfriend, Shaggy Rogers.
 The Four: Velma's older brothers in Scooby Apocalypse, who operate several underground facilities in which they perform weird scientific experiments, each positioned in strategic places of a specific field (Hugo Dinkley in the military, Cheeves Dinkley in politics, Quentin Dinkley in the Secret Service and Rufus Dinkley in a research medical company). Velma describes them as a unique mind that seemed to share four bodies when they were younger. With Velma (as The Five), they created Project Elysium, unwittingly plunging the world into an apocalyptic nightmare.
 Aunt Meg and Uncle Evan: Velma's aunt and uncle (voiced by Julia Sweeney and Diedrich Bader), who live in a small town called Banning Junction which features in a Halloween episode of What's New, Scooby-Doo?.
 Daisy Dinkley: Rufus' trophy wife and Velma's sister-in-law in Scooby Apocalypse. Daisy is a secret genius, later joining the gang in an effort to find a cure to the nanite apocalypse.
 Marcy: Velma's cousin who studies mechanical engineering in college, and is the daughter of Meg and Evan. She is born on Halloween which over time leads to her hatred of the holiday as it usually upstages her birthday. Consequently, she uses a local legend and her engineering background to create mechanical scarecrow monsters to terrorize the town on her eighteenth birthday.
 Aman Dinkley: Velma's father in Velma, an Indian American would-be mystery writer.
 Diya Dinkley: Velma's absentee mother in Velma, a woman "with a bit of darkness" in her who left Velma and her father behind.
 Sophie Garcia: Velma's stepmother in Velma, a Latino self-made restaurateur who believes "Old Guys Rule" with zero sense of irony.
 Aunt Thelma: A marine biologist at the Coolsville Marine Institute whose dolphins were being stolen in the A Pup Named Scooby-Doo episode "Scooby Dude".
 Uncle Dave (Walton): A member of the U.S. Border Patrol, as seen in the episode Watch Out! The Willawaw!
 Great Uncle Dr. Basil Von Dinkenstein: Velma's infamous great-uncle, who purportedly creates the "Frankencreep" monster in the film Scooby-Doo! Frankencreepy.
 Verona Dempsey: Velma's rival importer in What's New, Scooby-Doo?
 Frederick Rufus "" Rogers-Dinkley: Velma's son with Shaggy Rogers (named after Fred Jones and Rufus Dinkley), as seen in the final volume of Scooby Apocalypse.

Portrayals

Voice actors
From 1969 to 1973, Nicole Jaffe voiced Velma. From 1976 to 1979, Pat Stevens voiced the character. From 1979 to 1980, Marla Frumkin provided her voice. After the character's absence from the 1980 to 1983 series, Frumkin reprised the role of Velma as a guest star in The New Scooby-Doo Mysteries. Velma was absent again until A Pup Named Scooby-Doo, when Christina Lange voiced the role. B.J. Ward voiced Velma in a Johnny Bravo crossover episode, then reprised her role in all films from Scooby-Doo on Zombie Island on through Scooby-Doo and the Cyber Chase as well as an episode of the Adult Swim animated series, Harvey Birdman, Attorney at Law. Nicole Jaffe returned temporarily to voice Velma in the direct-to-video films Scooby-Doo! and the Legend of the Vampire and Scooby-Doo! and the Monster of Mexico.

From 2002 until 2015, Velma was voiced by Mindy Cohn of The Facts of Life fame. In Scooby-Doo! Adventures: The Mystery Map, Velma is voiced by Stephanie D'Abruzzo. On July 8, 2015, it was announced that Kate Micucci would take over the role of Velma in the then-upcoming series Be Cool, Scooby-Doo!. Trisha Gum voiced Velma in The Lego Movie 2: The Second Part. Velma was voiced by Ariana Greenblatt as a child and Gina Rodriguez as a teenager in the animated film Scoob!, with Greenblatt being set to reprise the role of her younger self in Scoob!: Holiday Haunt before the film was canceled in August 2022. She makes a cameo as a spectator in Space Jam: A New Legacy. In February 2021, a spin-off adult animated prequel of her is in the works with Mindy Kaling voicing Velma while executing producing with Charlie Grandy, Howard Klein, and Sam Register.

On February 10, 2021, it was announced that Velma will have her own streaming television series on HBO Max in January 2023. Titled Velma, the series follows an adult-oriented and metafictional "love quadrangle" Mystery Inc. with Velma portrayed as being of Indian descent, although aware that she is normally white. On July 11, 2022, the trademark for the series was listed as abandoned, only for HBO Chief Content Officer Casey Bloys to confirm the series to still be in production in August, with it previewing at New York Comic Con on October 6, 2022. The first two episodes of the series debuted on HBO Max on January 12, 2023, the other eight being scheduled to release within the following months.

Additional voice actors
 Patricia Parris (Hanna-Barbera Educational Filmstrips)
 Robyn Moore (Pauls commercial)
 Grey DeLisle (one line in Scooby-Doo and the Cyber Chase, Mad)
 Linda Cardellini (Scooby-Doo 2: Monsters Unleashed: The Video Game, Robot Chicken)
 Krystal Harris (singing voice in Scooby-Doo! and the Legend of the Vampire in 2002)
 Bets Malone (singing voice in Scooby-Doo! Music of the Vampire in 2012)
 Cristina Vee (Scooby-Doo! Playmobil Mini Mysteries)
 Mindy Kaling (Velma)

Parodies
 Lori Alan (Family Guy)
 Meredith Salenger (Mad)
 Julie Nathanson (Mad)
 Kathryn Griffiths (The Demon Road Trilogy, as Linda)
 Joanna Adler (The Venture Bros, as Val)
 Clare Grant (Robot Chicken)

Live-action portrayals

In the 2002 and 2004 live-action films, Velma is played by Linda Cardellini, who then voiced her for the Scooby-Doo 2: Monsters Unleashed video game and Robot Chicken. Lauren Kennedy portrayed young Velma in a flashback sequence in Scooby-Doo 2: Monsters Unleashed. Velma is portrayed by Hayley Kiyoko in the 2009 live-action film Scooby-Doo! The Mystery Begins and its 2010 sequel Scooby-Doo! Curse of the Lake Monster. Sarah Gilman portrayed the young Velma in the 2018 direct-to-video film Daphne & Velma.

Additional live-action actors
 Randi Rosenholtz (Scooby-Doo! in Stagefright – Live on Stage (2001))
 Laura Sicurello (Scooby-Doo! and the Pirate Ghost - Live on Stage (2009))
 Michele Dumoulin (Scooby-Doo Live! Musical Mysteries (2013))
 Louise Wright (Scooby-Doo Live! The Mystery Of The Pyramid (2014))
 Rebecca Withers (Scooby-Doo Live! Musical Mysteries (2016))

Parodies
 Jane Silvia (Jay & Silent Bob Strike Back (2001))

References

American female characters in television
Animated human characters
Female characters in film
Fictional amateur detectives
Fictional paranormal investigators
Fictional American Jews
Fictional Jewish women
Scooby-Doo characters
Teenage characters in film
Teenage characters in television
Television characters introduced in 1969
Female characters in animated series
Female characters in animated films
Child characters in animated films
Teenage characters in animated films